Cause may refer to:

Relationships between events
 Causality
 Cause and effect, a relationship between one event and another

Law
 Cause, a lawsuit
 Just cause (employment law)
 Probable cause
 Show cause

Other uses
 Cause, such as a social cause, a pursuit, belief, or purpose of one or more people, that they advocate for, or donate or share resources to support or advance, e.g.,: a(n)
 Belief in something
 Ethical ideal (principles or value)
 Causes (company), an online company
 Cause (medicine)
 Cause (river), in Bouches-du-Rhône, southern France

See also
 Caus Castle, Shropshire, England
 Causation in law